Megan Rivers (born 10 October 1980) is an Australian field hockey player who competed in the 2008 Summer Olympics and 2012 Summer Olympics. Her nicknames are Snowy and Nanny Rivs. Megan's club is the NSW Arrows in Sydney, NSW, Australia. She plays right hand and is a midfielder. Her coach is Adam Commens.  She was born in Bowral, New South Wales.

References

External links
 

1980 births
Living people
Australian female field hockey players
Olympic field hockey players of Australia
Field hockey players at the 2008 Summer Olympics
Field hockey players at the 2012 Summer Olympics
People from Bowral
Commonwealth Games medallists in field hockey
Commonwealth Games gold medallists for Australia
Field hockey players at the 2010 Commonwealth Games
Sportswomen from New South Wales
Medallists at the 2010 Commonwealth Games